Cyclocodon is a genus of flowering plants belonging to the family Campanulaceae.

Its native range is Tropical and Subtropical Asia.

Species:

Cyclocodon axillaris 
Cyclocodon lancifolius 
Cyclocodon parviflorus

References

Campanuloideae
Campanulaceae genera